Joseph Bishara (born July 26, 1970) is an American composer, music producer, and actor, best known for his work scoring films such as Insidious, 11-11-11, Dark Skies, and The Conjuring. Although his career began with the 1998 Biblical drama Joseph's Gift, he composes music for mainly horror and thriller films, and has collaborated several times with director James Wan. Projects by directors John Carpenter and Joseph Zito, and musicians Ray Manzarek and Diamanda Galás have incorporated his work. In addition to composing, he frequently appears in films he is involved in, usually made up as a demon or other supernatural creature. He has also been a producer on Repo! The Genetic Opera and other projects.

Biography

Early endeavors
After an early influence of classical music, Bishara began experimenting with electronic and experimental music, becoming interested in Tangerine Dream. He became engrossed in horror film scores after watching the silent film The Cabinet of Dr. Caligari of 1920 and the 1922 horror classic Nosferatu. In the late 1980s he became a member of the industrial band Yesterday's Tear, later known as Drown. By around 1994, he was signed to a record and touring contract with Drown. He also briefly toured with Prong.

Film scoring
Although Bishara's film score work began with the Biblical drama Joseph's Gift in 1998, most of his subsequent work has comprised horror films starting with Unearthed and The Gravedancers in 2006 and Night of the Demons in 2009. His collaborations with filmmaker James Wan led to his prominence as a film score composer and popularity in the industry.

He began to be the subject of more media attention with the Wan-directed film Insidious in 2011. The New York Times film critic Mike Hale remarked that Bishara's score helped the film recover from some of its negative attributes such as "pedestrian camerawork". Writing for Howlin' Wolf Records, Jason Comerford referred to the film soundtrack as a "dense, bristling effort jam-packed with invention and energy".  Journalist Jonathan Barkan of Dread Central and Bloody Disgusting named the musical accompaniment as "one of the great masterpieces of horror music from this century". The score was performed by a string quartet accompanied by Bishara producing sounds on a rusted piano using hammers, files, and other "experimental instruments" of his design. Much of the music was recorded before Wan began shooting the film, the musicians improvising some parts as they went along but following Bishara's broad structure and concept. Bishara began sending completed recordings to Wan as he was editing the film so Wan could work the score into the film according to the structure he desired. Though film composers are typically more involved in music placement, Bishara noted the process used on Insidious felt "free". He also acted in the film, portraying a demon that served as the film's main antagonist.

Bishara went on to score the Darren Lynn Bousman film 11-11-11. In 2013, he worked with Scott Stewart to write the music for the science fiction horror film Dark Skies. Writing for Film Journal International, critic Justin Lowe referred to the score as "unnerving" but suitable within the background of the action. Bishara then reunited with Wan to compose the music for The Conjuring. He also portrays an entity named Bathsheba in the film. Wan's producers gave him wide latitude to decide who he wanted to work with him on the film, so he brought back many of the crew from Insidious, including Bishara. Bishara composed the music for the sequel to Insidious, Insidious: Chapter 2 (2013), but did not return to portray the demon.

In 2014, Bishara scored the John R. Leonetti horror film Annabelle, for which he received an ASCAP Top Box Office Films award. He next composed the music for a segment of the 2014 anthology film V/H/S: Viral, "Gorgeous Vortex", as well as the Wan production Insidious: Chapter 3, and another horror film, The Vatican Tapes, on which he replaced Mike Patton of Faith No More. Bishara scored the music for the 2016 horror thriller The Other Side of the Door and returned to work with Wan, composing for The Conjuring 2 and appearing in the film as an entity named the "Winged Creature" (credited as "Demon"). He also scored the 2018 installment in the Insidious film series, Insidious: The Last Key.

Bishara announced in August 2018 that his label, Void Recordings, would release a 27-track compilation of developmental and unreleased music from the Insidious film series, More Music From the Further. Writing for the horror web site Bloody Disgusting, producer Brad Miska said that the compilation carried an avant-garde style over its entirety. He compared it to works by Tangerine Dream and John Carpenter, and said it also bore elements of classical, early goth, and industrial music.

Production and sound design
In addition to composing, Bishara has worked in other aspects of film production, providing sound design services for John Carpenter's Ghosts of Mars and acting as music producer for Repo! The Genetic Opera. The Ghosts of Mars project involved programming and remixing music composed by Carpenter and determining how it would be integrated into the film. In 2015, Bishara helped produce the song "Shroud" on rapper Tech N9ne's album Special Effects. He worked with Tech N9ne in 2018 to produce and co-write the song "Brightfall" for the Planet album. The song inspired a series of horror shorts starring Tech N9ne and Bishara.

Acting
Bishara acts in several of the films he is musically involved in, usually portraying demons or other supernatural entities. Miska refers to him as a "creature performer". His debut performance was as the main antagonist in Insidious, the Lipstick-Face Demon, a role he reprised in Insidious: Chapter 2 and Insidious: The Last Key. He portrayed Bathsheba in The Conjuring, and demonic creatures in The Conjuring 2 and the Annabelle film series.

Musical style
Bishara is known to be fond of horror, and he has said he favors composing for the genre above others: "It is the one that had the most energy for me. There always just seemed to be something a little bit more compelling about being on the edge of everything going away." He is known for his avant-garde style and unique approach to instrumentation and composition that suits horror films particularly well. Music journalists have noted his disregard for horror film score conventions, employing "gut-wrenching string dissonance, haunting electronic sounds and sudden crescendoes" and using strings and percussion to create effects designed to evoke "maximum shock effect" in the listener. Marine Wong Kwok Chuen of Score It Magazine wrote that "Bishara's distinctive sounds of fear have become instant classics in modern horror", citing the distinctive styles of the Insidious and Conjuring films, while journalist Jonathan Barkan wrote "There is no safety in Bishara’s music... nor should there be."

Works

Film

Sound producer and designer
 Ghosts of Mars (2001)
 Repo! The Genetic Opera (2008)

Television

Actor

Awards 
 2010 – Fangoria Chainsaw Award for Best Score – Insidious

References
Notes

Cited sources
 
 
 
 
 
 
 
 
 
 
 
 
 
 
 
 {{cite web |last=Nelson |first=Ken |title=Interview with ''The Conjurings jack-of-all-trades Joseph Bishara |url=http://geekroom.com/movies/horror/interview-with-the-conjurings-jack-of-all-trades-joseph-bishara-part-1/ |work=GeekRoom.com |access-date=August 31, 2013 |date=July 18, 2013 |ref= |archive-url=https://web.archive.org/web/20130822063735/http://geekroom.com/movies/horror/interview-with-the-conjurings-jack-of-all-trades-joseph-bishara-part-1/ |archive-date=August 22, 2013 |url-status=dead }}
 
 
 
 
 
 Other sources'''

External links
 Official web site
 
 

American film score composers
American male film score composers
American male film actors
Living people
1970 births